Dianne Warren (born August 28, 1950) is a Canadian novelist, dramatist and short story writer.

Background
Warren was born in Ottawa, Ontario. Her mother grew up on a farm in Saskatchewan and worked in Ottawa during the 1940s. Her father, a World War II veteran, was from a small lumber town in the Ottawa Valley. Her parents met in Ottawa after the war, married, had two babies, and then moved to Saskatchewan. Although the family travelled back to Ottawa every few years to visit that side of the family, the extended family that Dianne grew up with was her mother's family, who remain farm and ranch people. She spent as much time as possible with her grandparents on the farm and grew up loving the prairie landscape.

She studied art at university and graduated with a degree in Fine Arts. She continued writing during those years, although in isolation and without the benefit of mentors or writing friends. About the time that she turned thirty, she decided she needed to learn more about writing. She took some writing classes through the English Department at her local university, and met several published and emerging writers that remain friends and colleagues to this day. She was invited to join a writing group called The Bombay Bicycle Club and the diligence with which its members approached the art of literary critique set her on the path to becoming a published writer.

Career
Warren's first short story was published in 1982 in the anthology Saskatchewan Gold.  Her fiction has appeared in anthologies such as The Old Dance, Fire Beneath the Cauldron and Concrete Forest. Her short story collections include The Wednesday Flower Man (1987), Bad Luck Dog (1993) and A Reckless Moon (2002).

Her novel Cool Water (released as Juliet in August in the US) won the Governor General's Award for English fiction in Canada. It has been published in several countries since then, including France and Australia.

Her first book, The Wednesday Flower Man, was published in 1987 by the burgeoning Saskatchewan press Coteau Books. Two more story collections followed: Bad Luck Dog in 1993 and A Reckless Moon in 2002. She has a soft spot for Bad Luck Dog because it won the Saskatchewan Book of the Year Award about the same moment that Joe Carter hit the home run that won the Toronto Blue Jays the World Series. The room at the Saskatchewan Book Awards erupted in cheers (for Joe Carter).

She also wrote three stage plays in those years, all of which were produced by 25th Street Theatre in Saskatchewan. Her play Serpent in the Night Sky was short-listed for the Governor General's Award for drama in 1989. She no longer writes plays.

Her first novel Cool Water was published in 2010 in Canada and in 2012 in the US (as Juliet in August). She claims to have been working on this book her whole life since it is informed by the iconography of the western books and movies she grew up with, and the shadow of the past in the novel is, in a sense, her family's past.

On June 2, 2020 her latest novel, The Diamond House, was published.

Personal Life 
Dianne lives in Regina, Saskatchewan with her husband, visual artist Bruce Anderson. They have two sons. Her hobbies are still reading and horses.

Plays
 Serpent in the Night Sky was a finalist for the 1992 Governor General's Award for Drama
 The Last Journey of Captain Harte was published in 1999
 Club Chernobyl was published in 1994 and won the City of Regina Book Award
All three plays premiered at Twenty-Fifth Street Theatre and were all directed by Tom Bentley-Fisher.

Warren also wrote several dramatic works for CBC Radio.

Awards
Bad Luck Dog won three Saskatchewan Book Awards, including Book of the Year.

Warren also won the National Magazine Gold Award for Fiction and the Western Magazine Award for Fiction. She won the Marian Engel Award from the Writers' Trust of Canada in 2004.

She published her first novel, Cool Water, in 2010. The novel won the Governor General's Award for English-language fiction at the 2010 Governor General's Awards, and was also longlisted for the Scotiabank Giller Prize.

In 2021, she won the inaugural Glengarry Book Prize for her latest novel, The Diamond House. The award is presented by the Saskatchewan Foundation for the Arts.

List of works

References

1950 births
Living people
Canadian women dramatists and playwrights
Canadian women novelists
Governor General's Award-winning fiction writers
Canadian women short story writers
Writers from Ottawa
20th-century Canadian novelists
21st-century Canadian novelists
20th-century Canadian dramatists and playwrights
21st-century Canadian dramatists and playwrights
20th-century Canadian women writers
21st-century Canadian women writers
20th-century Canadian short story writers
21st-century Canadian short story writers